In biology, the PYLIS downstream sequence (PYLIS: pyrrolysine insertion sequence) is a stem-loop structure that appears on some mRNA sequences. This structural motif was previously thought to cause the UAG (amber) stop codon to be translated to the amino acid pyrrolysine instead of ending the protein translation. However, it has been shown that PYLIS has no effect upon the efficiency of the UAG suppression, hence even its name is, in fact, incorrect.

See also
SECIS element

References

Further reading

External links
 

Cis-regulatory RNA elements